Mehmandust or Mohamandust, also rendered as Mihmandust, may refer to:
 Mohamandust-e Olya (disambiguation), Ardabil Province
 Mehmandust-e Sofla, Ardabil Province
 Mehmandust, East Azerbaijan
 Mehmandust, Semnan
 Mehmandust Rural District, in Ardabil Province